Series 4 of the ITV programme Foyle's War was first aired in 2006. It is the only series to be divided into two parts, one comprising two episodes screened in 2006, and the other comprising two from 2007. It was the last series of four episodes; later series had only three. It is set in the period from March 1942 to March 1943.

Episodes (Part 1)

"Invasion"

Cast and characters
The episode marks the transfer of Station Sergeant Ian Brooke to Hastings from Deptford in London, and also the arrival of Captain John Keiffer and his 215th Engineer Battalion (Aviation) who plan to establish a US Army Air Force landing field nearby. Foyle is befriended by Keiffer, an engineer from Northbridge, Massachusetts, in a relationship that deepens since the two share a common interest in fly-fishing. Keiffer also mentions the loss of his younger brother on the Reuben James in October 1941. Milner's friend, Will Grayson, is a fellow survivor of the failed Norwegian Campaign and the man who helped rescue and evacuate Milner from Trondheim. Stewart meanwhile receives a Dear Jane letter from Andrew Foyle, who is now stationed at RAF Debden, and as a result she accepts a date with Keiffer's driver, Private Joe Farnetti (which irks the senior Foyle who thinks she is being somewhat unfaithful).

Background and Production
The arrival of American "Doughboy" forces to England, which began on 26 January 1942, marked the start of another dramatic change to the English wartime homefront as resentment against US forces (as expressed in the sayings "late to the last war, late to this one" or "over-sexed, over-paid and over here") began again. Around this time, forced land requisitioning for military use increased sharply, while rationing of basic goods continued. RAF Debden, where the younger Foyle is stationed, parallels the story of transferring resources to American Forces, since it was transferred some six months after this episode (on 12 September 1942) to the Eighth Air Force. Filmed: March–April 2005

"Bad Blood"

Cast and characters
Joe Farnetti, Stewart's American boyfriend from California, proposes on the beach to her, but she stalls for more time. Farnetti incorrectly states he did his training at Fort Benning in Virginia (Ft Benning is in Georgia). Edith Ashford, an old school friend of Milner (and sister of the accused) re-friends him and expresses a romantic interest. Foyle and Fielding are shown to be old yet distanced colleagues and ex-WW1 soldiers. Fielding mentions "bad blood" after surviving a chlorine gas attack during the Second Battle of Ypres.

Background and Production
Milner mentions the abolition of rations for private petrol, a law which came into effect on 1 July 1942. Mention is made by Leonard Cartwright of Convoy PQ 17 and of the sinking of the Christopher Newport and Navarino which happened on 4–5 July 1942. Simon Higgins (the blinded scientist on the bed) refers to The London School of Hygiene & Tropical Medicine, and Foyle is given streptomycin to treat Stewart - although in error as streptomycin was not discovered until 1943. Filmed: April–May 2005

Episodes (Part 2)

"Bleak Midwinter"

Cast and characters
Milner and Ashford continue their budding relationship, but things are complicated by the sudden return of Milner's wife Jane (Mali Harries) after an absence of more than a year. Stewart and Brooke spend the episode lobbying Foyle for the chance to eat a confiscated turkey before it spoils.

Background and Production
This episode focuses on the problems within a war-time munitions factory, such as health and safety, as well as pay inequality for munitionettes. Jane Milner mentions the 3-year separation cool-down period for a divorce under the Matrimonial Causes Act. It also revisits the theme of black-marketeering. Filmed: February–March 2006

"Casualties of War"

Cast and characters
Stewart notes that The Wizard of Oz is playing at the Palace Theatre. She brings the Brighter Blackout Book (1939) to Foyle's house to amuse young James. Also, when Milner chats with one of Michael Richards' students, they mention the Sexton Blake and Just William books.

Background and Production
The episode again touches upon the theme of immunity from justice despite the war that aims to champion such noble ideals as British law and order. Much of the episode's historical content was inspired by the invention of the bouncing bomb and the Dambusters raid of 1943, as portrayed in the film The Dam Busters. Writer Anthony Horowitz planned his story to "shadow" one aspect of the bomb's development; the episode depicts a group of scientists experimenting with a mechanism to put backspin on the bomb. The test sequence was designed to replicate the actual tests, including a depiction of the official cameraman, which allowed them to add in archive footage. Another historical reference in this episode is the bombing of the Sandhurst Road School, in Catford, South East London, on 20 January 1943, in which 38 children and six teachers were killed, and some 60 other children and adults were injured. Filmed: March–April 2006

International broadcast
The two episodes for part 2 screened in Denmark on 5 and 12 September 2006, some months before their ITV debut. Part 1 was broadcast in the United States on PBS on Mystery! on 17 and 24 June 2007, and part 2 on 1 and 8 July 2007, as Foyle's War IV. The series was added to Netflix as of April 2014.

References

External links 
 Series 4 on IMDb

Fiction set in 1942
Foyle's War episodes
2006 British television seasons
2007 British television seasons